Launch Complex 5  may refer to:

 Cape Canaveral Air Force Station Launch Complex 5, a site used for various Redstone and Jupiter launches
 Vandenberg AFB Space Launch Complex 5, a launch pad at Vandenberg Air Force Base
 Pad 5 at Baikonur Cosmodrome Site 1, an active R-7 (Soyuz) launch pad at Baikonur
 Site 5 at the Svobodny Cosmodrome
 Woomera Launch Area 5